An Equal Playing Field is a 2015 sports documentary about American soccer player Christen Press and the challenges of being a women's soccer player.

In 2016, it was shown at the Women's Sports Film Festival in Oakland, California.

Notes

External links
 
 Complete film on YouTube (7:39)

2015 television films
2015 films
Documentary films about women's association football
History of the United States women's national soccer team
Soccer on United States television